Neomyxine caesiovitta, the blueband hagfish, is a species of hagfish endemic to New Zealand. 
This species can reach a length of  SL.

References

Myxinidae
Marine fish of New Zealand
Taxa named by Andrew L. Stewart
Taxa named by Vincent Zintzen
Fish described in 2015